A death in custody is a death of a person in the custody of the police, other authorities or in prison. In the 21st century, death in custody remains a controversial subject, with the authorities often being accused of abuse, neglect and cover-ups of the causes of these deaths.

By country

Algeria
See Human rights in Algeria
The killing of civilians is mentioned under Article 8(2)(a)(i) of the Rome Statute. And the act of killing civilians would be considered a war crime under ICC Statute.

Argentina
See Human rights in Argentina

Australia

In Australia, deaths in custody automatically trigger an inquest.

Bangladesh
At least 32 people have died in "Operation Clean Heart" by the government of Bangladesh. See Human rights in Bangladesh

Burma
See Insein Prison, Human rights in Burma

Chad
See Human rights in Chad

China
See Human Rights in China.

Congo
See Human rights in the Democratic Republic of the Congo

Cuba
See Human rights in Cuba

Egypt
See Human rights in Egypt

Germany

Oury Jalloh
Rosa Luxemburg

India

In the financial year 2021–22, the National Human Rights Commission reported 2152 deaths in judicial custody and 155 deaths in police custody.

Indonesia
See Cipinang Penitentiary Institution

Iran
See 1988 executions of Iranian political prisoners and Deaths in custody in Iran

Ireland
See Terence Wheelock

Jamaica
"At least 650 people have been killed by police officers in Jamaica since 1999. Many of these have been blatantly unlawful killings, yet not one officer has been convicted since then."
Piers Bannister, Amnesty International's Jamaica researcher.

Japan
See Human rights in Japan

Laos
See Human rights in Laos

Libya
See Abu Salim prison

Malaysia
Kugan Ananthan
Teoh Beng Hock
Gunasegaran Rajasundram

Mexico
See Human rights in Mexico

Morocco
See Human rights in Morocco

The Netherlands
See Milan Babić#Death, Death of Slobodan Milošević. On the 27th of June 2015, Mitch Henriquez was arrested at the Malieveld in The Hague after he claimed to have a weapon. During the arrest he suffocated due to the chokehold of two police officers. They were put on trial and served sentences for manslaughter. After his death, there were several weeks of riots throughout the Netherlands.

North Korea
See Human rights in North Korea

Norway 
About 40 people have died in police custody over a period of 20 years following 1990. Additionally there's been 45 suicides in custody over a 10-year period from 2008.

Pakistan
See Human rights in Pakistan

Russia

See Sergei Magnitsky; Salman Raduyev; Maxim Martsinkevich.

Saudi Arabia
See Human rights in Saudi Arabia

Somalia
See Human rights in Somalia

South Africa
South Africa has an unusually high level of deaths in custody. For example, in April to June 1997, there were 56 deaths in custody.
 Neil Aggett
 Richard Turner
 Steve Biko

Sudan
See Human rights in Sudan

Syria
See Tadmor Prison massacre

Turkey
See Prisons in Turkey

UAE
See Human rights in the United Arab Emirates

United Kingdom

United States

Definition of custody 
The term "in custody" has been debated in both California v. Beheler (in regards to what constitutes custody in the requirement to read Miranda rights) but also in other federal court cases related to Miranda law and definition of custody. Although Miranda law has roughly defined custody as the "formal arrest or restraint on freedom of movement," colloquial language may be less restrictive in the use of custody and is thus sometimes difficult to distinguish from the process of arrest. In addition to collecting data on those who have died in custody, the Bureau of Justice Statistics also tracks all deaths related to arrest. This aids in collecting data from the fringes of custody or attempts to arrest an individual.

Causes of death 
The causes for death in police custody may range from suspected homicide by members of the police, killings by other inmates, death due to psychological or physical abuse, capital punishment, to suicide, accidental death, or natural causes. The United States Bureau of Justice Statistics collects data regarding both the cause of death, as well as medical and criminal records of those that die in police custody (restricted to those in federal prison and local jails).

Estimates 
The Bureau of Justice Statistics estimates that 17,358 individuals in custody died during the period from 2007 to 2010. Other publications focus on the rate per 100,000. US jails report deaths that total a mortality rate of 128, and prisons at 264 per 100,000. There are differences in methodology used to obtain these statistics, as some jurisdictions include deaths during attempted arrests, while others do not.

Other research has focused on specific states, such as Maryland and the rate of death by identity (gender, race, age). Based on some findings, African-American males appear to be over-represented as victims of sudden custody deaths. Further research with larger sample sizes is necessary.

Watchdog organizations 
The Marshall Project collects and produces reports on police killings as well as maintaining a curated list of links to articles and publications related to death in police custody in the United States.

Selected persons who have died in custody 

 Sandra Bland (woman found hanging in her Waller County, Texas jail cell due to apparent suicide)
 Henry "Peg" Gilbert, shot in police custody in 1947 in Harris County, Georgia; the sheriff claimed self-defense, but Gilbert, a prosperous farmer, was found to have been severely beaten before being shot 
 Freddie Gray (suffered injuries while being transported by police in Baltimore, Maryland, that led to a coma and his death)
 Michael Tyree (a mentally ill inmate held in a California county jail was beaten to death by three guards, who were convicted in June 2017 of his death)
 Elliott Williams (died in his Tulsa County, Oklahoma jail cell due to complications from multiple injuries)
 Ricardo Alfonso Cerna (committed suicide in police interview room)
 Missouri State Penitentiary riot (death of four inmates)
 New Mexico State Penitentiary riot (33 inmate deaths and over 200 injuries)
 Darren Rainey (scalded to death in shower at Dade Correctional Institution in 2012)
 Jeffrey Epstein died August 10, 2019, at the Metropolitan Correctional Center, New York due to alleged suicide, although this has been subject to conspiracy theories.

Foreign custody by American agents (police, military, etc.)

International custody law 
There are numerous laws and international treaties regarding treatment of foreigners, especially during wartime, of which the Geneva Convention is the most widely recognized and internationally ratified. It contains provisions that classify and define both prisoners of war (as well as civilians and the wounded or infirm) and the manner in which they are to be treated. These include but are not limited to: murder, mutilation, hostage taking, and outrages upon personal dignity. These ratified documents are the base of US international custody law and can be seen to be misapplied in some of the proceeding cases.

Examples of persons who have died in custody 
 Jamal Naseer (Afghan soldier allegedly beaten to death by US forces)
 Nagem Hatab (Iraqi killed by elements and possible heart attack)
 Manadel al-Jamadi (suspected terrorist tortured and killed)

Vietnam
See Human rights in Vietnam

Yemen
See Human rights in Yemen

Zimbabwe
See Human rights in Zimbabwe

See also
 Capital punishment in the United States
 Detention
 Infectious diseases within American prisons
 Life imprisonment
 Prison overcrowding
 Prisoner rights in the United States
 Private prison
 War on Drugs
 Extrajudicial killing
 List of prison deaths
 Police brutality
 Prisoner suicide
 Capital punishment
 Institutional racism
 African-American family structure#Black male incarceration and mortality
 :Category:People who died in police custody
 :Category:People who died in prison custody
 List of killings by law enforcement officers in the United States
 List of freedom indices

References

Custody
Imprisonment and detention
Deaths in custody